Fahad Masood (born 14 August 1981) is a Pakistani cricket coach and former first-class cricketer who plays for Lahore.

Since his retirement he has become a coach, including being the assistant coach to the Northern U19 Blues.

References

External links
 

1981 births
Living people
Pakistani cricketers
Zarai Taraqiati Bank Limited cricketers
Bahawalpur cricketers
Habib Bank Limited cricketers
Lahore cricketers
People from Vehari District
Punjabi people
Pakistani cricket coaches